Gradski vrt Stadium is a multi-use stadium in Osijek, Croatia. It is located in the Gradski vrt neighbourhood in Novi grad city district. With a capacity of 17,061, it has been the home ground of two Croatian football clubs, NK Osijek and Fortuna VNO Osijek.

History 
Construction started in 1949, but works were stopped several times. The first match played on the ground of Gradski Vrt was played between NK Osijek and FK Sloboda Tuzla on 7 September 1958. In 1980, the stadium was officially opened.

In 1982, the record of stadium attendance was broken, on the football match between NK Osijek and Dinamo Zagreb. At that match, there were 40,000 attendants. The result was 1–2.

In 1998 seats and reflectors were installed. In 2005, the stadium was renovated. Under the west stand, VIP rooms were set and the lodge was rearranged, adding 1,000 new seats. The athletics track was reconstructed, repainted from red to blue. After this renovation, the stadium has fulfilled UEFA's stadium criteria. In the same year, the stadium was a part of Croatia and Hungary's failed bid for the 2012 European Football Championship. At that time a project of a new stadium with a larger capacity was presented.

In 2010, the stadium was again repaired: the pitch was relaid, fences were painted and the seats were numbered. The reason was a friendly match between Croatia and Wales, which was held on 23 May that year.

In May 2016, the stadium hosted the Croatian Cup final.

Future

In April 2018, NK Osijek president Ivan Meštrović released plans for a new stadium for the club. A new state of the art stadium will be built at the Pampas neighbourhood in Osijek as part of the new NK Osijek training centre. The capacity of the new stadium will be 13,000, with all of the seats covered. The stadium will be UEFA category four and is supposed to be finished in Autumn 2022. During the stadium construction, NK Osijek will play their home games at the current stadium, which is in the future going to be used as the main stadium for the NK Osijek B squad.

International fixtures

Gallery

References

External links
 Stadion Gradski vrt at Stadium Guide

NK Osijek
Sports venues in Osijek
Football venues in Croatia
Athletics (track and field) venues in Croatia
Football venues in Yugoslavia
Athletics (track and field) venues in Yugoslavia
Buildings and structures in Osijek-Baranja County
1980 establishments in Yugoslavia
Sports venues completed in 1980